Saint Cloud is the fifth studio album by American indie rock act Waxahatchee, released on March 27, 2020, by Merge Records.

Background
Waxahatchee frontwoman Katie Crutchfield described the album's main themes as "addiction and codependency". Much of Saint Cloud was inspired by her struggles with alcoholism, which came to a fore during the promotional tour for Waxahatchee's Out in the Storm (2017), and subsequent decision to get sober. Crutchfield titled the album and its titular song after her father's hometown of St. Cloud, Florida, a small community outside of Orlando.

Critical reception

Robert Christgau reviewed the album in his Substack-published "Consumer Guide" column in July 2020. While suggesting that the "recovery songs" toward the album's end recount life experiences not relatable for the average listener, he applauded Crutchfield's performance through the opening series of "love/relationship/self-knowledge songs", with "her guitar parts echoing readymades so approximately and unaffectedly they sound fresh all over again, her soft voice so casual and personable and smart".

Accolades

Track listing

Personnel
Musicians
 Katie Crutchfield – vocals, acoustic guitar, piano, keyboards
 Brad Cook – bass, acoustic guitar, piano, keyboards, synthesizer
 Bobby Colombo – electric guitar, acoustic guitar, keyboards
 Bill Lennox – electric guitar, acoustic guitar, keyboards, percussion, vocals
 Nick Kinsey – drums, percussion
 Josh Kaufman – electric guitar, piano, organ, percussion

Technical personnel
 Brad Cook – production
 Jerry Ordonez – engineering
 Jon Low – additional engineering, mixing
 Brent Lambert – mastering

Artwork
 Molly Matalon – photos
 Andreina Byrne – set production
 Mike Krol – design

Charts

References

2020 albums
Waxahatchee albums
Merge Records albums